Yaroslav Igorevich Podlesnykh (born 3 September 1994) is a Russian volleyball player, a member of the Russian men's national volleyball team.

Sporting achievements

Clubs
 CEV Cup
  2020/2021 – with Dynamo Moscow

 National championships
 2020/2021  Russian Cup, with Dynamo Moscow
 2020/2021  Russian Championship, with Dynamo Moscow
 2020/2021  Russian Super Cup, with Dynamo Moscow
 2021/2022  Russian Championship, with Dynamo Moscow
 2021/2022  Russian Super Cup, with Dynamo Moscow

References

1994 births
Living people
Russian men's volleyball players
Olympic volleyball players of Russia
Volleyball players at the 2020 Summer Olympics
Sportspeople from Stavropol Krai
Medalists at the 2020 Summer Olympics
Olympic silver medalists for the Russian Olympic Committee athletes
Olympic medalists in volleyball
Outside hitters